Sazköy can refer to:

 Sazköy, Amasya
 Sazköy, Bozkurt
 Sazköy, Çaycuma
 Sazköy, Uğurludağ